Michelle Vergara Moore is an Australian actress, best known for her role as Ella/Lily in the NBC TV series La Brea, Roxanne Waters in the Special Broadcasting Service television series The Unusual Suspects, Chai Li Tivoli in The Time Of Our Lives, Carla Tizon in Condor and Black & White & Sex.

Early life
Michelle was born in country Victoria, the sixth of ten children. Growing up in the western suburbs of Melbourne, she was offered a place to study acting at both the Western Australian Academy of Performing Arts (WAAPA) and the National Institute of Dramatic Art (NIDA). Completing the Bachelor of Dramatic Art in Acting, she graduated from the NIDA, where she met her future husband.

Acting career
Michelle made her first US screen appearance in the crime-thriller film Side Effects, directed by Steven Soderbergh. Other American credits include a series regular role on the NBC series La Brea and a recurring role opposite Bob Balaban in the spy thriller series Condor. She also made a guest appearance playing an Australian ex-model, Gemma, in High Maintenance on HBO.

Michelle starred in the Australian independent film Black & White & Sex, which premiered at the Sydney Film Festival with its international premiere at the 41st International Film Festival Rotterdam.

Michelle was one of the first actors of Asian origin to play a lead series regular role in an Australian television show, in two seasons of The Time of Our Lives, which was nominated for a Logie Award for Most Outstanding Drama Series.

In 2021, Michelle starred as Roxanne Waters alongside Miranda Otto and Susie Porter in The Unusual Suspects. In a case of art imitating life, in The Unusual Suspects, she acts opposite her husband Toby Leonard Moore, who plays the character's husband, Jordan Waters. All episodes are streaming on Hulu and SBS On Demand. Also in 2021, Michelle was a recurring guest star in two TV series; as CIA Agent, Carla Tizon, on Season 2 of Condor airing on Epix and; in Season 1 of the NBC series La Brea. Michelle was upped to a Series Regular cast member on La Brea for Season 2.

Personal life
Moore is a dual U.S./Australian citizen and resides in New York City with her husband, fellow Australian actor, Toby Leonard Moore.

References

External links
 

 Michelle Vergara Moore on Facebook

Michelle Vergara Moore on Instagram

Living people
Australian stage actresses
National Institute of Dramatic Art alumni
Year of birth missing (living people)
Australian television actresses
Actresses from Melbourne
Australian people of Filipino descent
Australian actresses of Asian descent